Máximo Tajes Caceres (November 23, 1852 – November 21, 1912) was a Uruguayan political figure.

Background

Tajes came from a military background. He was a member of the Colorado Party (Uruguay), which ruled the country almost uninterruptedly for a century. He served as Minister of War from 1882 to 1886 under President Máximo Santos.

In November 1886, President Santos, with whom he had poor relations, stepped down from his second term of office.

President of Uruguay

Tajes served as President of Uruguay from 1886 to 1890.

He was succeeded as President by his Colorado Party (Uruguay) colleague Julio Herrera y Obes.

Death and legacy

Máximo Tajes died two days before his 60th birthday in November 1912. His residence, near Cerrillos and close to the banks of the Santa Lucia river, is situated on a location called Parrador Tajes. It has become a house museum which is open to the public free of charge.

A road in Carrasco, Montevideo, is named after Máximo Tajes.

See also

 Colorado Party (Uruguay)#Earlier History
 Politics of Uruguay

References

 :es:Máximo Tajes

1852 births
1912 deaths
People from Canelones, Uruguay
Presidents of Uruguay
Colorado Party (Uruguay) politicians
Defence ministers of Uruguay
19th-century Uruguayan people
Uruguayan military personnel